Tom Ross (born 1981) is a British Labour politician and leader of Trafford Metropolitan Borough Council in Greater Manchester. Prior to becoming leader, he was the council's executive member for finance and governance and was Mayor of Trafford, a ceremonial position, during the 2018-2019 municipal year.

First elected to the council in 2008, Ross is the councillor for Stretford ward. He was elected as council leader on 4 January 2023, following his predecessor Andrew Western's election as Member of Parliament for Stretford and Urmston.

Early Life 
Ross was educated at Altrincham Grammar School for Boys.

References 

Living people
Councillors in Trafford
Labour Party (UK) councillors
Leaders of local authorities of England
1985 births
People educated at Altrincham Grammar School for Boys